Various Indian artists and films have received or been nominated for the Golden Globe Awards in different categories. At the 16th Golden Globe Awards, V. Shantaram's 1957 Hindi-language film Do Aankhen Barah Haath (Two Eyes, Twelve Hands) won the Samuel Goldwyn International Film Award. At the 40th Golden Globe Awards 1982 English-language biographical film Gandhi, an international co-production between NFDC India and the United Kingdom, won Golden Globe for Best Foreign Film. 

At the 66th Golden Globe Awards, Indian composer A. R. Rahman won the Best Original Score for Slumdog Millionaire. At the 80th Golden Globe Awards, Telugu language film RRR got nominated for two categories including Best Non-English Language Film; and Indian composer M. M. Keeravani winning Best Original Song for "Naatu Naatu".

Awards and Nominations

See also 
 List of Indian winners and nominees of the Academy Awards
 List of Indian winners and nominees at the Cannes Film Festival
 List of Indian submissions for the Academy Award for Best International Feature Film
 List of Indian Grammy Award winners and nominees

References 

Cinema of India
Lists of Indian films
Golden Globe Award winners
Golden Globe Awards